The vision theory or vision hypothesis is a term used to cover a range of theories that question the physical resurrection of Jesus, and suggest that sightings of a risen Jesus were visionary experiences. It was first formulated by David Friedrich Strauss in the 19th century, and has been proposed in several forms by critical contemporary scholarship, including Helmut Koester, Géza Vermes, and Larry Hurtado, and members of the Jesus Seminar such as Gerd Lüdemann.

Christian apologists, scholars, and theologians object against the theory, taking the resurrection to be a literal, bodily phenomenon.

Hypothesis

Subjective vision theory
Origen's response to the second century philosopher Celsus provides the earliest known literary record of a vision hypothesis; it was later popularized by 19th century theologian David Strauss. David Friedrich Strauss (1808–1874), in his Life of Jesus (1835), argued that the resurrection was not an objective historical fact, but a subjective "recollection" of Jesus, transfiguring the dead Jesus into an imaginary, or "mythical," risen Christ. The appearance, or Christophany, of Jesus to Paul and others, was "internal and subjective." Reflection on the Messianic hope, and Psalms 16:10, led to an exaltated state of mind, in which "the risen Christ" was present "in a visionary manner," concluding that Jesus must have escaped the bondage of death. Strauss' thesis was further developed by Ernest Renan (1863) and Albert Réville (1897). These interpretations were later classed the "subjective vision hypothesis", and "is advocated today by a great majority of New Testament experts."

According to Ehrman, "the Christian view of the matter [is] that the visions were bona fide appearances of Jesus to his followers", a view which is "forcefully stated in any number of publications." Ehrman further notes that "Christian apologists sometimes claim that the most sensible historical explanation for these visions is that Jesus really appeared to the disciples."

According to De Conick, the experiences of the risen Christ in the earliest written sources – the "primitive Church" creed of 1 Corinthians 15:3–5, Paul in 1 Corinthians 15:8 and Galatians 1:16 – are ecstatic rapture events.

Exaltation of Jesus
According to Hurtado, the resurrection experiences were religious experiences which "seem to have included visions of (and/or ascents to) God's heaven, in which the glorified Christ was seen in an exalted position." These visions may mostly have appeared during corporate worship. Johan Leman contends that the communal meals provided a context in which participants entered a state of mind in which the presence of Jesus was felt.

According to Ehrman, "the disciples' belief in the resurrection was based on visionary experiences." Ehrman notes that both Jesus and his early followers were apocalyptic Jews, who believed in the bodily resurrection, which would start when the coming of God's Kingdom was near. Ehrman further notes that visions usually have a strong persuasive power, but that the Gospel accounts also record a tradition of doubt about the appearances of Jesus. Ehrman's "tentative suggestion" is that only a few followers had visions, including Peter, Paul and Mary. They told others about those visions, convincing most of their close associates that Jesus was raised from the dead, but not all of them. Eventually, these stories were retold and embellished, leading to the story that all disciples had seen the risen Jesus. The belief in Jesus' resurrection radically changed their perceptions, concluding from his absence that he must have been exalted to heaven, by God himself, exalting him to an unprecented status and authority.

Call to missionary activity
According to Helmut Koester, the stories of the resurrection were originally epiphanies in which the disciples are called to a ministry by the risen Jesus, and at a secondary stage were interpreted as physical proof of the event. He contends that the more detailed accounts of the resurrection are also secondary and do not come from historically trustworthy sources, but instead belong to the genre of the narrative types.

According to Gerd Lüdemann, Peter had a vision of Jesus, induced by his feelings of guilt of betraying Jesus. The vision elevated this feeling of guilt, and Peter experienced it as a real appearance of Jesus, raised from dead. He convinced the other disciples that the resurrection of Jesus signalled that the endtime was near and God's Kingdom was coming, when the dead who would rise again, as evidenced by Jesus. This revitalized the disciples, starting-off their new mission.

According to Biblical scholar Géza Vermes, the resurrection is to be understood as a reviving of the self-confidence of the followers of Jesus, under the influence of the Spirit, "prompting them to resume their apostolic mission." They felt the presence of Jesus in their own actions, "rising again, today and tomorrow, in the hearts of the men who love him and feel he is near."

Objective vision theory
Hans Grass (1964) proposed an "objective vision hypothesis," in which Jesus' appearances are "divinely caused visions," showing his followers that his resurrection "was a spiritual reality." Jesus' spirit was resurrected, but his body remained dead, explaining the belated conversion of Jesus' half-brother James. Grass' "objective" vision hypothesis finds no echo in more recent scholarship.

Cognitive dissonance reduction

A further explanation is provided by the theory of cognitive dissonance. While Jesus' early followers expected the immediate installment of the Kingdom of God, the delay of this cosmic event led to a change in beliefs. According to a naturalistic explanation, in a process of cognitive dissonance reduction, Jewish scriptures were re-interpreted to explain the crucifixion and visionary post-mortem experiences of Jesus. The belief that Jesus' resurrection signaled the imminent coming of the Kingdom of God changed into a belief that the resurrection confirmed the Messianic status of Jesus, and the belief that Jesus would return at some indeterminate time in the future, the Second Coming c.q. Parousia, heralding the expected endtime. The same process may have led to intensive proselytization, convincing others of the developing beliefs to reduce cognitive dissonance, explaining why the early group of followers grew larger despite the failing expectations.

Criticism
Several Christian scholars such as Gary Habermas, William Lane Craig and Michael Morrison have argued against the vision explanations for the textual accounts of a physical resurrection. According to Habermas, most scholars on Christology are "moderate conservatives", who believe that Jesus was raised from the dead, either physically or spiritually. While the vision theory has gained support among critical scholars since the last quarter of the 20th century, "the vast majority of scholars" still reject the possibility of subjective visions or hallucinations as an explanation for the resurrection-experiences. Habermas himself views these critical approaches as "efforts to dismiss the central event and doctrine of orthodox Christianity". Craig holds that the resurrection appearances are far too diverse to be classified as hallucinations; Craig and Lüdemann entered a written debate on the subject in 2000.

British scholar NT Wright holds that visions of the dead were always associated with spirits and ghosts, and never with bodily resurrection. Thus, Wright argues, a mere vision of Jesus would never lead to the unprecedented belief that Jesus was a physically resurrected corpse; at most, he would be perceived as an exalted martyr standing at the right hand of God. Wright argues, "precisely because such encounters [visions of the dead] were reasonably well known [...] they [the disciples] could not possibly, by themselves, have given rise to the belief that Jesus had been raised from the dead [...] Indeed, such visions meant precisely, as people in the ancient and modern worlds have discovered, that the person was dead, not that they were alive."

Dale Allison has expressed similar criticisms, and has argued that visions alone would never lead to the belief in a bodily resurrection. He writes "If there was no reason to believe that his [Jesus's] solid body had returned to life, no one would have thought him, against expectation, resurrected from the dead. Certainly visions of or perceived encounters with a postmortem Jesus would not by themselves, have supplied such reason."

German Biblical scholar Martin Hengel notes that Lüdemann's theory transcends the limits of historical research, by providing an analysis which is not verifiable.

See also
 Swoon hypothesis
 Stolen body hypothesis
 Historical Jesus
 Historicity of Jesus

Notes

References

Sources
Printed sources

 

 

 

 

 

 
 
 

 Gerd Lüdemann, The Resurrection of Jesus, trans. John Bowden (Minneapolis: Fortress Press, 1994)

 

 
 

Web-sources

Further reading
 

Historicity and origin of the Resurrection of Jesus
Post-resurrection appearances of Jesus